Giovanna Pala (born 15 July 1932) is an Italian actress. She appeared in ten films from 1951 to 1956.

Filmography

References

External links 

1932 births
Living people
Italian film actresses